Zhaoli Qaghan (昭禮可汗) was tenth ruler of Uyghurs. His personal name was recorded as Yaoluoge Hesa (藥羅葛曷薩) in Chinese sources. His Uyghur name could be Qasar or Xazar.

Background 
He was a younger brother of Chongde and a son of Baoyi Qaghan. He was a tegin during his brother's and father's reign and styled as Hesa Teqin (曷薩特勤). He succeeded his brother in 824.

Reign 
Upon his enthronement, he received 12 chariots as gift and 500000 pieces of silk as a trade for horses from Emperor Wenzong of Tang. He received additional tribute of 200000 pieces of silk in 827. Another tribute was recorded in 829. He was murdered in early 833 by his ministers, who made his nephew Hu Tegin, to succeed him as Zhangxin Qaghan. Mourning ceremony in Chang'an was on 20 April 833 .

Notes

References 

833 deaths
9th-century monarchs in Asia
9th-century murdered monarchs
9th-century Turkic people
Ädiz clan